Pterichis is a genus of flowering plants from the orchid family, Orchidaceae. It is native to South America, Central America and Jamaica.

Species recognized as of June 2014:

Pterichis acuminata Schltr. - Colombia, Ecuador, Peru
Pterichis bangii Rolfe - Bolivia
Pterichis boliviana Schltr. - Bolivia, Argentina
Pterichis colombiana G.Morales - Colombia
Pterichis fernandezii G.Morales - Colombia
Pterichis galeata Lindl. - Colombia, Bolivia, Argentina, Ecuador, Peru, Costa Rica  
Pterichis habenarioides (F.Lehm. & Kraenzl.) Schltr. - Costa Rica, Panama, Colombia, Ecuador, Venezuela
Pterichis latifolia Garay & Dunst. - Venezuela
Pterichis leucoptera Schltr. - Peru
Pterichis macroptera Schltr. - Peru
Pterichis mandonii (Rchb.f.) Rolfe - Bolivia
Pterichis multiflora (Lindl.) Schltr. - Colombia, Ecuador, Venezuela, Argentina
Pterichis parvifolia (Lindl.) Schltr. - Colombia, Ecuador, Peru
Pterichis pauciflora Schltr. - Colombia, Ecuador
Pterichis proctorii Garay - Jamaica
Pterichis saxicola Schltr. - Bolivia
Pterichis silvestris Schltr. - Bolivia, Peru
Pterichis triloba (Lindl.) Schltr. - Colombia, Ecuador, Peru
Pterichis weberbaueriana Kraenzl. - Peru
Pterichis yungasensis Schltr. - Bolivia

References

External links 

Cranichideae genera
Cranichidinae